A Woman Scorned is a 1911 American short silent drama film directed by D. W. Griffith and starring Blanche Sweet.

Cast
 Wilfred Lucas as The Doctor
 Claire McDowell as The Doctor's Wife
 Alfred Paget as The Sneak Thief's Companion
 Frank Evans as A Policeman
 Adolph Lestina
 Charles Hill Mailes as A Policeman
 Vivian Prescott
 Blanche Sweet

See also
 D. W. Griffith filmography
 Blanche Sweet filmography

References

External links

1911 films
Silent American drama films
American silent short films
Biograph Company films
American black-and-white films
1911 drama films
Films directed by D. W. Griffith
1911 short films
1910s American films
1910s English-language films
American drama short films